Florian Baak (born 18 March 1999) is a German professional footballer who plays as a defender in Finland for Honka.

Club career
On 12 October 2020, Baak signed a two-year contract with the Swiss club FC Winterthur.

References

External links
 

1999 births
Living people
Footballers from Berlin
German footballers
Association football defenders
Germany youth international footballers
Hertha BSC II players
Hertha BSC players
FC Winterthur players
FC Honka players
Regionalliga players
Bundesliga players
Swiss Challenge League players
Veikkausliiga players
German expatriate footballers
German expatriate sportspeople in Switzerland
Expatriate footballers in Switzerland
German expatriate sportspeople in Finland
Expatriate footballers in Finland